The New York City Department of Sanitation Environmental Police (DSNY Police) is part of the Enforcement Division, New York City Department of Sanitation (DSNY) and is the law enforcement arm, of the DSNY.

It's charged with regulating and enforcing NYC sanitation laws.

Structure
The DSNY Environmental Police is one part of the three enforcement units:

Enforcement Division
Permit and Inspection Unit
Environmental Police Unit

These are all staffed by sanitation workers and Special officers.

Powers and Authority
DSNY ( Police Unit ) are appointed as Special officers who are New York State Peace Officers, as per New York Criminal Procedure Law, 2.10, section. 59, which states that [sic]:

Rank Structure
The rank structure is similar to other NYC law enforcement agencies.

Equipment and Vehicles

Their uniform is similar to other NYC law enforcement agencies.

dark blue (or white for LTs and above) shirt
dark blue trousers
black boots
dark jacket
eight-point peaked cap with shield
duty belt.

DSNY ( Police Unit ) Special Officers who are licensed and armed, who carry handcuffs, batons.

See also
Law enforcement in New York City
New York City Department of Sanitation

External links
Sanitation Task Force – documentary on YouTube
Exclusive: Undercover Sanitation Police Fight Crime And Grime – news report on YouTube

References

Law enforcement agencies of New York City
1936 establishments in New York City